The Ukai Dam, constructed across the Tapi River, is the second largest reservoir in Gujarat after the Sardar Sarovar. It is also known as Vallabh Sagar. Constructed in 1972, the dam is meant for irrigation, power generation and flood control. Having a catchment area of about 62,255 km2 and a water spread of about 52,000 hectares, its capacity is almost same as that of the Bhakra Nangal Dam. The site is located 94 km from Surat.

The dam is an earth-cum-masonry dam. Its embankment wall is 4,927 m long. Its earth dam is 105.156 meters high, whereas the masonry dam is 68.68 meters high. The dam's left bank canal feeds water to an area of 1,522 km2. and its right canal provides water to 2,275 km2 of land.

A fort built by the Gaekwad dynasty of Baroda was submerged in the reservoir. It can be spotted when water levels in the reservoir goes down.

Ukai Hydro Power Station

There are four hydro turbine units, each of 75 MW with a total installed capacity of 300 MW.  All the above units were made by BHEL. Commissioning dates of units 1 to 4 are: 8 July 1974, 13 December 1974, 22 April 1975 and 4 March 1976.

See also

 Sardar Sarovar Dam
 Wier-Cum Causeway on Tapi
 Songadh Fort

References

Dams in Gujarat
Dams on the Tapti River
Hydroelectric power stations in Gujarat
Surat district
Masonry dams
Dams completed in 1972
1972 establishments in Gujarat
20th-century architecture in India